The Mandarin Ducks and Butterflies school (鴛鴦蝴蝶派) was a popular genre of Chinese fiction in the first half of the 20th century, especially in the 1920s. Mandarin ducks (which are frequently seen in pairs) and butterflies (from Butterfly Lovers) are traditional symbols of romantic love, but the genre encompassed more than romance stories: scandals and "high crimes" were also favorite subjects. Mandarin Ducks and Butterflies stories were disparaged by progressive writers of the May Fourth school for being essentially escapist and showing no social responsibility. The genre gradually fell out of favor following Japanese invasions in the 1930s.

Zhang Henshui's 1930 novel Fate in Tears and Laughter is a representative work of this school.
Su Manshu 's 'The Lone Swan' is another representative work for this genre.

See also
Wuxia fiction, another popular genre of Chinese escapist fiction

Further reading

Chinese literary movements
20th-century Chinese literature